Cardita is a genus of marine bivalve molluscs in the family Carditidae.

Naming 
Especially in the early 19th century, this genus was often confused with the Carditid genus Cardites. Cardita was originally established by J.G. Bruguière in 1792. However, in 1801 Jean-Baptiste Lamarck described it under the name Cardites. J.H.F. Link subsequently described a new genus using the name Cardites in 1807. When this homonymy was realised, Megerle in 1811 re-described Link's genus Cardites as Cardita.

Megerle's action resulted in four technically valid names which formed two mutual pairs of homonyms. The matter was ultimately resolved by starting with the oldest name – that of Bruguière – and applying it as intended, and suppressing Lamarck's name so that Link's junior homonym could be used for Cardites.

In addition to the numerous junior synonyms, Byssomera – a junior synonym or subgenus of Carditamera – has sometimes been written as a subgenus of Cardita, due to its type species having been synonymised from Cardita (Byssomera) affinis to Carditamera (Byssomera) affinis.

Species 
According to the WoRMS :

Cardita aviculina Lamarck, 1819
Cardita caliculaeformis Deshayes in Maillard, 1863
Cardita calyculata (Linnaeus, 1758)
Cardita crassicosta Lamarck, 1819
Cardita distorta Reeve, 1843
Cardita excisa Philippi, 1847
Cardita ffinchi (Melvill, 1898)
Cardita hawaiensis (Dall, Bartsch & Rehder, 1938)
Cardita kyushuensis (Okutani, 1963)
Cardita leana Dunker, 1860
†Cardita marwicki Laws, 1944
Cardita muricata G.B. Sowerby I, 1833
†Cardita northcrofti Marwick, 1928
Cardita pica Reeve, 1843
Cardita senegalensis Reeve, 1843
Cardita variegata Bruguière, 1792
Cardita vinsoni Viader, 1951

References

Carditidae
Bivalve genera